is a railway station on the Hisatsu Line in Kirishima, Kagoshima, Japan, operated by Kyushu Railway Company (JR Kyushu). The station opened in 1903.

Lines
Ōsumi-Yokogawa Station is served by the Hisatsu Line.

Adjacent stations

Surrounding area
Kirishima City Yokogawa Branch Office
Kirishima City Yokogawa Elementary School
Yokogawa Post Office
Kyūshū Expressway

See also
 List of railway stations in Japan

External links

  

Railway stations in Japan opened in 1903
Railway stations in Kagoshima Prefecture